Cambria is a neighborhood of the town of Christiansburg, Montgomery County, Virginia. Originally an independent town from Christiansburg, Cambria stretches along Cambria Road, extending north of the Train Depot on Depot Street. It is part of the Blacksburg-Christiansburg Metropolitan Statistical Area which encompasses all of Montgomery County, Virginia and the Virginia cities of Blacksburg, Christiansburg, and Radford for statistical purposes.

A post office was established at Cambria in 1890, and remained in operation until it was discontinued in 1965.

References

Unincorporated communities in Montgomery County, Virginia
Former municipalities in Virginia
Unincorporated communities in Virginia
Blacksburg–Christiansburg metropolitan area
Neighborhoods in Virginia